The Stern–Gerlach Medal is the most prestigious German Award for experimental physicists, named after the scientists of the Stern–Gerlach experiment, Otto Stern and Walther Gerlach.

The prize, awarded annually since 1993, is awarded by the Deutsche Physikalische Gesellschaft (DPG). The Stern–Gerlach Medal followed the Stern-Gerlach-Prize in 1993, which was enhanced through a medal in 1992.

Laureates of the Stern-Gerlach-Prize (1988 – 1992) 
 1988 
 1989 
 1990  (Max-Planck-Institut für Sonnensystemforschung, Katlenburg-Lindau)
 1991 Dirk Dubbers und 
 1992 Wolfgang Krätschmer

Laureates 

1993 
1994 Wolfgang Kaiser
1995 
1996 Heinz Maier-Leibnitz
1997 Peter Armbruster
1998 Herbert Walther
1999 
2000 Theodor W. Hänsch
2001 Achim Richter
2002 Jan Peter Toennies
2003 Reinhard Genzel
2004 Frank Steglich
2005 
2006 Erich Sackmann
2007 Peter Grünberg
2008 
2009 Friedrich Wagner
2010 
2011 
2012 Rainer Blatt
2013 Dieter Pohl
2014 Gerhard Abstreiter
2015 Karl Jakobs
2016 Werner Hofmann
2017 Laurens Molenkamp
2018 
2019 , Johanna Stachel
2020 Dieter Bimberg
2021 Joachim Ullrich
2022 Frank Eisenhauer
2023 Manfred Fiebig

See also

 List of physics awards

External links
Stern-Gerlach-Medaille at Deutsche Physikalische Gesellschaft

Physics awards
German awards